Mlađan Dinkić (born 20 December 1964) is a Serbian economist, musician and former politician.

He was the 1st Governor of the National Bank of Serbia, serving from 2000 to 2003. He then served as the Minister of Finance from 2004 to 2006. He also served as the Minister of Economy and Regional Development and Deputy Prime Minister of Serbia from 2007 until his sacking in 2011. His last political post was as the Minister of Finance and Economy from 2012 to 2013. Following the 2014 parliamentary election, he announced his retirement from the politics.

Early life and education
Dinkić was born in Belgrade, Serbia, Yugoslavia. He graduated from the First Economy highschool in Belgrade in 1983 and obtained his B.A. at the University of Belgrade Faculty of Economics in 1988 and his M.Sc. in 1993.

He has served as a teaching assistant for Theory and Planning of Economic Development at the University of Belgrade Faculty of Economics since 1994.

Dinkić's main fields of research are: high inflation and shadow financial markets, public sector deficits and its macroeconomic implications and measuring efficiency of resource use (on the macro and project level).

Dinkić is an avid guitar player and has his own rock band called "Monetary Coup".

Political career
Mlađan Dinkić entered politics as a co-founder of the G17 Plus NGO in 1997. He later served as vice-president of the G17 Plus from 2003 to 2006 after it became a political party. Dinkić was elected leader of the G17 Plus in 2006 after incumbent leader Miroljub Labus stepped down.

Dinkić served as governor of the National Bank of Serbia from 2000 to 2003, at age 36 he was the youngest governor of the bank in its history.

Dinkić received the 2007 award for Euromoney Finance Minister of the Year by Euromoney magazine. He received the 2009 award for Reformer of the Year for his contribution to the development of a climate conductive to business in Serbia and many others.

In 2014, following the 2014 parliamentary election and poor results of his party, he announced his retirement from politics.

References

External links

 

|-

|-

|-

1964 births
Living people
Politicians from Belgrade
Finance ministers of Serbia
Government ministers of Serbia
G17 Plus politicians
20th-century Serbian economists
Governors of the National Bank of Yugoslavia
Governors of the National Bank of Serbia
University of Belgrade Faculty of Economics alumni
21st-century Serbian economists